Jackboot Mutiny (literally It Happened on 20 July) is a 1955 German film directed by Georg Wilhelm Pabst about the 20 July Plot to assassinate Adolf Hitler. It features Bernhard Wicki as Stauffenberg.

Cast
 Bernhard Wicki as Oberst Graf Claus Schenk von Stauffenberg
 Karl Ludwig Diehl as Generaloberst a.D. Ludwig Beck
 Carl Wery as Generaloberst Friedrich Fromm
 Kurt Meisel as SS Obergruppenführer
 Erik Frey as General Friedrich Olbricht
 Albert Hehn as Major Otto Ernst Remer
 Til Kiwe as Oberleutnant Werner von Haeften
 Jochen Hauer as Generalfeldmarschall Wilhelm Keitel
 Annemarie Sauerwein as Frau Olbricht
 Jaspar von Oertzen as Oberst Albrecht Mertz von Quirnheim
 Willy Krause as Joseph Goebbels
 Lina Carstens as Frau des Küsters
 Gernot Duda as Leutnant in der Wolfsschanze
 Ernst Fritz Fürbringer as Generalfeldmarschall Erwin von Witzleben
 Peter Lühr as 1. General

See also
 The Plot to Assassinate Hitler (1955) German feature film

References

External links
 

1955 films
1955 war films
German war films
West German films
1950s German-language films
German black-and-white films
Films about the 20 July plot
Films directed by G. W. Pabst
Films set in Berlin
1950s German films